Benton Albert Kribbs (November 17, 1918 – January 12, 1968) was an American college athletics administrator. He attended Clarion State College (now, Clarion University of Pennsylvania) and served as the head coach of that school's football, basketball, and baseball teams from 1949 to 1952. He was hired as the head basketball coach at Bucknell University in 1952 and held that job for 10 years until 1962 when he became Bucknell's athletic director. He held that job until his death in 1968.

References

1918 births
1968 deaths
American football ends
Basketball coaches from Pennsylvania
Bucknell Bison athletic directors
Clarion University of Pennsylvania alumni
Bucknell Bison men's basketball coaches
Clarion Golden Eagles baseball coaches
Clarion Golden Eagles football coaches
Clarion Golden Eagles football players
Clarion Golden Eagles men's basketball coaches
High school football coaches in Pennsylvania
People from Clarion County, Pennsylvania
Players of American football from Pennsylvania